The 1989–90 Washington Capitals season was the Washington Capitals 16th season in the National Hockey League (NHL). The team reached the Prince of Wales Conference Finals for the first time, losing to the Bruins 4 games to 0.

Offseason

NHL Draft

Regular season

Final standings

Schedule and results

Playoffs

Round 1: (P2) New Jersey Devils vs. (P3) Washington Capitals

Round 2: (P1) New York Rangers vs. (P3) Washington Capitals

Conference Finals: (A1) Boston Bruins vs. (P3) Washington Capitals

Player statistics

Regular season
Scoring

Goaltending

Playoffs
Scoring

Goaltending

Note: GP = Games played; G = Goals; A = Assists; Pts = Points; +/- = Plus/minus; PIM = Penalty minutes; PPG=Power-play goals; SHG=Short-handed goals; GWG=Game-winning goals
      MIN=Minutes played; W = Wins; L = Losses; T = Ties; GA = Goals against; GAA = Goals against average; SO = Shutouts; SA=Shots against; SV=Shots saved; SV% = Save percentage;

References
 Capitals

Washington Capitals seasons
Wash
Wash
1989 in sports in Washington, D.C.
1990 in sports in Washington, D.C.